Otitoma crokerensis is a species of sea snail, a marine gastropod mollusk in the family Pseudomelatomidae, the turrids and allies.

Description
The length of the shell attains 8 mm.

Distribution
This marine species occurs off Croker Island, Northern Territory, Australia.

References

 Shuto, T. 1983. New turrid taxa from the Australian waters. Memoirs of the Faculty of Sciences of Kyushu University, Series D, Geology 25: 1-26

External links
 Gastropods.com: Otitoma crokerensis
 Kilburn R.N. (2004) The identities of Otitoma and Antimitra (Mollusca: Gastropoda: Conidae and Buccinidae). African Invertebrates, 45: 263-270
 Morassi M., Nappo A. & Bonfitto A. (2017). New species of the genus Otitoma Jousseaume, 1898 (Pseudomelatomidae, Conoidea) from the Western Pacific Ocean. European Journal of Taxonomy. 304: 1-30

crokerensis
Gastropods described in 1983
Gastropods of Australia